The gens Urbinia was an obscure plebeian family at ancient Rome.  Only a few members of this gens are mentioned by Roman writers, but others are known from inscriptions.

Origin
The surname Urbinus probably referred to a native of Urbinum in Umbria.

Members

 Gaius Urbinius, quaestor in 74 BC, served under Quintus Caecilius Metellus Pius in Hispania Ulterior.
 Urbinius Panopion, proscribed by the Second Triumvirate, was saved by one of his slaves, who exchanged clothes with him, and was slain in his place.
 Urbinia, a woman whose estate was contested by a certain Clusinius Figulus, who claimed to be her son, and retained the advocate Labienus to represent him against Urbinia's heirs, represented by Gaius Asinius Pollio.  Quintilian describes a rhetorical trick of Asinius, who implied that Figulus' case was exceptionally weak by describing Labienus himself as the strongest point in the plaintiff's favour.
 Lucius Urbinius Quartinus, a native of Africa, was a soldier in the praetorian guard, where he served in the century of Faenius Justus.  He was buried at Misenum in Campania, aged sixty, having served for twenty-five years, in a tomb built by Lucius Valerius Saturninus, dating from the second century, or the first half of the third.
 Marcus Urbinius Rufus, a native of Dacia, dedicated a tomb at Misenum, dating between the middle of the second century and the middle of the third, for his fellow-soldier, Cassius Albanus, a native of Corsica, aged thirty years, two months, and two days.
 Gaius Urbinius Victor, buried in a third-century tomb at Genua in Liguria.

Undated Urbinii
 Urbinius Micssi[...] buried at Ad Aquas Caesaris in Africa Proconsularis, aged eighty, along with Su[...]cia Rogata, aged thirty.
 Urbinius Sic[...], named in a pottery inscription from Germania Inferior.

See also
 List of Roman gentes

Notes

References

Bibliography
 Gaius Sallustius Crispus (Sallust), Historiae (The Histories).
 Valerius Maximus, Factorum ac Dictorum Memorabilium (Memorable Facts and Sayings).
 Marcus Fabius Quintilianus (Quintilian), Institutio Oratoria (Institutes of Oratory).
 Publius Cornelius Tacitus, Dialogus de Oratoribus (Dialogue on Oratory).
 Appianus Alexandrinus (Appian), Bellum Civile (The Civil War).
 Theodor Mommsen et alii, Corpus Inscriptionum Latinarum (The Body of Latin Inscriptions, abbreviated CIL), Berlin-Brandenburgische Akademie der Wissenschaften (1853–present).
 René Cagnat et alii, L'Année épigraphique (The Year in Epigraphy, abbreviated AE), Presses Universitaires de France (1888–present).
 George Davis Chase, "The Origin of Roman Praenomina", in Harvard Studies in Classical Philology, vol. VIII, pp. 103–184 (1897).
 Paul von Rohden, Elimar Klebs, & Hermann Dessau, Prosopographia Imperii Romani (The Prosopography of the Roman Empire, abbreviated PIR), Berlin (1898).
 T. Robert S. Broughton, The Magistrates of the Roman Republic, American Philological Association (1952–1986).
 Lothar Bakker and Brigitte Galsterer-Kröll, Graffiti auf römischer Keramik im Rheinischen Landesmuseum Bonn (Graffiti from Roman Pottery in the Bonn Rhineland Museum), Bonn (1975).

Roman gentes